Jacqueline Bouvier Kennedy was wearing a pink suit when her husband, President John F. Kennedy, was assassinated in Dallas, Texas on November 22, 1963. She insisted on wearing the suit, stained with his blood, during the swearing-in of Lyndon B. Johnson that afternoon and for the flight back to Washington D.C. Jacqueline Kennedy was a fashion icon, and the suit is arguably the most referenced and revisited among her clothing items.

Made of wool bouclé, the double-breasted, raspberry pink and navy trim collared suit was matched with a trademark pink pillbox hat and white gloves. A long-time question among fashion historians and experts about whether the suit was made by Chanel in France or a quality copy purchased from New York's semiannual Chez Ninon collections, was resolved by Coco Chanel's biographer, Justine Picardie. She showed that the suit was a garment made by Chez Ninon using Chanel's approved "line for line" system with authorized Chanel patterns and materials.

The suit as fashion

In the late 1950s and early 1960s, the Chanel suit was one of the strongest symbols of bourgeois female chic that could be found anywhere in the Western world, evoking a powerful image of a sophisticated, intelligent and independent modern woman. During this era it became the "wardrobe staple of the upwardly mobile American female which could fit almost every daytime occasion that required a woman to dress stylishly". Although women wearing pink in the 21st century is common, pink was new to fashion in the 1950s and was a color loved and even popularized to an extent in American fashion by Mamie Eisenhower, who endorsed a color which, according to cultural historian Karal Ann Marling, was called "Mamie Pink". Given that the Chanel suit was a strong statement of an independent woman, the color pink has an element of traditional femininity, perhaps evading the foreign and feminist attributes associated with the Chanel suit in a conservative American society.

Before John F. Kennedy departed for Texas he asked his wife what she planned to wear. In an interview with William Manchester after the tragedy, Kennedy said that her husband had told her: 

It was said that the pink suit was one of her husband's "particular favorites"; the suit had first been shown by Coco Chanel in her 1961 autumn/winter collection. Photographs exist of Mrs. Kennedy wearing the suit – or one very similar to it – in Washington D.C. in November 1961; to church on November 12, 1961; in London on March 26, 1962; in Washington D.C. in September 1962; in Lafayette Square on September 26, 1962; at the visit by the Prime Minister of Algeria on October 15, 1962; and the visit of the Maharaja of Jaipur on October 23, 1962. After the last of these occasions, she was apparently not photographed wearing it until the day of the assassination, when she was pictured in it at Fort Worth and Dallas leading up to the assassination, having been revealed wearing it after stepping out of Air Force One at Love Field.

The suit was double-breasted, with six gold buttons and four square pockets, two on each side. The fabric was a light weight wool from Linton Tweeds in a nubby weave known as bouclé. The color was raspberry although most press reports described it as strawberry pink. The wide quilted collar, jacket lining, piping trim on the sleeves, and at the top of each pocket was navy blue silk. There were two gold buttons on each sleeve. The buttons on the suit had navy blue piping around the edge. A clever feature of Chanel jackets was a small gold chain sewn along the inside bottom edge of jacket to provide just enough weight for it to hang straight. The suit came with a sleeveless navy silk shell blouse. For cool weather, Kennedy would wear a matching navy silk scarf knotted at the neck and tucked into the front of the jacket, which she did in Dallas. Accompanying the suit was a trademark pillbox hat in matching pink with a band of navy piping around the crown. She secured the hat to her head with a standard hatpin. Kennedy carried a navy handbag with a gold buckle and gold chain handle. She wore low-heeled navy shoes with a small gold ornament at the toe. A gold bangle bracelet on her left wrist and short white kid leather gloves with tiny wrist buttons completed her outfit. 
Most of the American public viewing pictures of the presidential couple on television and in newspapers between 1961 and 1963 would not have known the color of the suit, given that at the time of the assassination TV news was still in black and white and newspapers did not print color photographs. The color of the suit became widely known only after the publication of color photos in Life magazine's JFK memorial issue November 29, 1963 and in Life's Warren Commission report issue October 2, 1964.

Authenticity

There was long a question among fashion historians and experts whether the suit was made by Chanel in France or a garment purchased from New York's Chez Ninon, a popular dress shop that imported European label designs and materials and put them together in the United States. A number of sources claimed it was more than likely a version of a Chanel pink bouclé wool suit trimmed with a navy blue collar, some asserting it was made by Chez Ninon in 1961. Further complicating the matter was the indisputable fact that the First Lady's "official" designer was Oleg Cassini, who provided much of her public as well as private wardrobe. In her 2010 authorized biography of Coco Chanel, Justine Picardie resolved the matter, stating the fabric, buttons and trim for the jacket came from Chanel in Paris, from which the suit was made and fitted for Kennedy at Chez Ninon, using Chanel's approved "line for line" system. Picardie insists this system had nothing to do with forgery or trademark infringement, since Chanel supplied the materials to Chez Ninon. The purpose of buying the suit from Chez Ninon was not to save money – the costs were the same – but to appear patriotic to the American electorate by buying her garments from the United States rather than France. The suit in 1963 was estimated to cost $800 to $1,000 ($ to $ in  dollars).

Assassination

Kennedy was seated to the left side of the President in the back seat of the open-top presidential limousine as the vehicle traveled through local streets in Dallas. Immediately after he was shot in the head, her suit was spattered by his blood.

Upon arriving at Parkland Hospital, Vice President Lyndon B. Johnson's wife Lady Bird saw the car and said:

At the hospital, Kennedy continued to wear the blood-stained suit, but she had removed her hat. William Manchester wrote in The Death of a President:

The whereabouts of the hat today are unknown, and the last person known to have had it—her personal secretary, Mary Gallagher-refused to disclose its location before her death in 2022. Several people asked Kennedy whether she would like to change her suit but she refused. When Lady Bird offered to send someone to help her, she responded:

 Despite the advice of John F. Kennedy's physician, Admiral George Burkley, who "gently tried to persuade her to change out of her gore-soaked pink Chanel suit", she wore the suit alongside Vice President Johnson as he was sworn in on Air Force One as the 36th President of the United States. In the photograph of the ceremony (right) the blood stains cannot be seen as they were on the right-hand side of the suit. Lady Bird recalls that during the swearing-in:

Kennedy had no regrets about refusing to take the blood-stained suit off; her only regret was that she had washed the blood off her face before Johnson was sworn in.

Aftermath
When Jacqueline Kennedy finally removed her suit the following morning, her maid folded it and placed it in a box. Some days after the assassination this box was dispatched to Kennedy's mother, Janet Lee Auchincloss, who wrote "November 22nd 1963" on the top of the box and stored it in her attic. Eventually the box was given to the National Archives in Maryland, together with an unsigned note bearing the Auchincloss letterhead stationery. The note read: "Jackie's suit and bag worn Nov. 22, 1963". The suit, which was never cleaned, is kept out of public view in "an acid-free container in a windowless room ... the precise location is kept secret.

Kennedy continued to buy Chanel clothes for a time after the assassination.

Historical significance
Kennedy's Chanel suit has been variously described as "a famous pink suit which will forever be embedded in America's historical conscience", "one of those indelible images Americans had stored: Jackie in the blood-stained pink Chanel suit", "the most legendary garment in American history", and "emblematic of the ending of innocence".

The garment is now stored out of public view in the National Archives. It will not be seen by the public until at least 2103, according to a deed of Caroline Kennedy, Kennedy's sole surviving heir. At that time, when the 100-year deed expires, the Kennedy family descendants will renegotiate the matter.

Cultural references
The suit has been well referenced and replicated in theater and film. In 2011, a copy of the suit appeared in the mini-series The Kennedys. However, the Chanel copy was recreated by Giorgio Armani. Costume designer Madeline Fontaine recreated the suit for the 2016 film Jackie, with Natalie Portman portraying Kennedy; the buttons, chain, and label were provided by Chanel. Costume designer Jane Petrie recreated the suit for the eighth episode of the second season of The Crown, titled "Dear Mrs. Kennedy". In the Simpsons 1996 episode "Scenes from the Class Struggle in Springfield", the Chanel outfit worn by Marge Simpson (whose maiden name is Bouvier in a nod to the former First Lady) was modelled upon Kennedy's suit. In "Never Say Goodbye", the last installment of the famous "I Will Survive" trilogy, the main character's wife wears what is very clearly a homage to the suit.

See also
 List of individual dresses

References

External links

1960s fashion
1961 clothing
Assassination of John F. Kennedy
Chanel
Individual suits
Jacqueline Kennedy Onassis